Andrijana Stipaničić (born 18 September 1981 in Rijeka) is a Croatian biathlete. She is the first female Croatian biathlete to win points in World Cup by winning 39th place in 15 km Individual at Biathlon World Championships 2009.

References

External links
 Profile at International Biathlon Union

1981 births
Sportspeople from Rijeka
Croatian female biathletes
Living people
Biathletes at the 2010 Winter Olympics
Olympic biathletes of Croatia